Zama Lake 210 is an Indian reserve of the Dene Tha' First Nation in Alberta, located within Mackenzie County. It is west of Zama Lake.

References

Indian reserves in Alberta